Liolaemus umbrifer is a species of lizard in the family Liolaemidae. It is endemic to the Catamarca Province in northwestern Argentina.

It is a moderately-sized to large-bodied species. It is brown to black in coloration. It is commonly encountered on rocky hillsides and outcroppings in the Andean foothills at relatively high elevation.

References 

umbrifer
Lizards of South America
Reptiles of Argentina
Endemic fauna of Argentina
Taxa named by Fernando Lobo
Reptiles described in 2003